Habba Kadal is a wooden bridge located in the old city of Srinagar, in Jammu and Kashmir, India that crosses the Jhelum river. It was first built in 1551 by Sultan Habib Shah of the Shah Miri Dynasty and is one of the seven original bridges that have existed in the city for a long time. It had to be rebuilt during Dogra rule after the heavy floods of 1893. Although originally planned to be dismantled as the New Habba Kadal bridge made it redundant, the government, as part of its policy of preserving heritage, undertook renovation of the bridge. It was started in 2013 and took two years to complete. Finally, the bridge again opened to public in 2015.

See also
New Habba Kadal
Amira Kadal
Budshah Bridge

References 

Bridges in Srinagar
Buildings and structures in Srinagar
Bridges over the Jhelum River
Bridges in Jammu and Kashmir
Transport in Srinagar
19th-century establishments in Jammu and Kashmir